Northport is an unincorporated community in Morrill County, Nebraska, United States.

History
Northport was connected to The Burlington route in 1900 when the CB&Q built a branch from Alliance, Nebraska. A post office was established at Northport in 1910, and remained in operation until it was discontinued in 1975. Northport was named from its location on the north bank of the North Platte River.

References

Unincorporated communities in Morrill County, Nebraska
Unincorporated communities in Nebraska